The Chico Air Museum is a nonprofit aviation museum located at the Chico Municipal Airport in Chico, California. Its mission statement is to "collect, preserve, document and display aircraft, and aviation and space artifacts. The museum’s primary purpose is to educate and inspire people of all ages about aviation and the history of flight".

Exhibits 

The museum has a number of aircraft, artifacts and exhibits on display in a WW II era hangar that was originally part of the Chico Army Airfield (and once owned and operated by Aero Union). There is also an outside static display area, a large collection of scale models, and an extensive aviation research library. The museum's hangar is located next to the Chico Air Attack Base (CAAB). During fire season, visitors can watch air operations of multiple types of air tankers that use this base to re-load and re-fuel.

Airman Docent Program 
In 2016, the museum launched the Airman Docent Program, which allows children under the age of 18 to volunteer as museum docents

Improvements 
In addition to aircraft restoration, the museum is currently working on a space exhibit and is planning to improve the entrance to the hangar, including a "walk of honor".

Aircraft on display 
Below is a partial list of aircraft the museum has on display, as of September 2018.

McDonnell Douglas F-15 Eagle
North American F-86 Sabre
LTV A-7 Corsair II
Vultee BT-13 Valiant
SPAD S.XIII
Grumman AF-2S Guardian
Aero L-29 Delfin
Lockheed T-33 Shooting Star
Lockheed P-2 Neptune
Piasecki H-21 Workhorse
Bell 47
Antonov AN-2
Thorp T-211
Taylor Titch
Pitts Model 12
Schreder Airmate HP-11
Rotary Air Force RAF 2000

Photo gallery

See also 
 List of Aerospace Museums
 Chico Army Airfield

References

External links 

 Official website
 Museum's Facebook page

Museums in Butte County, California
Aerospace museums in California